Parklane Park is a  public park in southeast Portland, Oregon. The park was acquired in 1993.

References

External links
 

1993 establishments in Oregon
Parks in Portland, Oregon
Southeast Portland, Oregon